Polanie may refer to:
 Polans (western) or Polanie, a West Slavic tribe in the Warta River basin of the historic Greater Poland region
 Polans (eastern) or Polanie, an East Slavic tribe that inhabited both sides of the Dnieper river
 Polanie (video game), a 1996 Polish video game